Eugene William Beier (born 30 January 1940 in Harvey, Illinois) is an American physicist.

Beier received in 1961 his bachelor's degree from Stanford University and in 1963 his M.S. and in 1966 his Ph.D., with advisor Louis J. Koester Jr., from the University of Illinois at Urbana–Champaign with thesis A search for heavy leptons using a differential Cherenkov counter. He became in 1967 an assistant professor and in 1979 a full professor at the University of Pennsylvania.

Beier has worked, since the end of the 1970s, on neutrino physics, first at Brookhaven National Laboratory (Experiment 734) and then, starting in 1984, on the science team of Kamiokande II.

In 1987 Beier joined the science team at the Sudbury Neutrino Observatory (SNO). He was co-spokesperson for the United States collaborators (along with R. G. H. Robertson of the University of Washington) working on the Sudbury Neutrino Observatory. The SNO science team provided strong evidence for solar neutrino flavor transformation. This flavor transformation implies that neutrinos have non-zero masses. The total flux of all neutrino flavors measured by SNO agrees well with the best theoretical models of the sun.

His current research deals with the question of whether neutrinos are their own anti-particles; the investigation involves searching for the rare (and perhaps entirely hypothetical) neutrino-less double beta decay occurring within atomic nuclei.

In 2010 Beier received the Panofsky Prize. Also, he was Chair of the Division of Particles and Fields of the American Physical Society in 2000. He was a member of the International Committee for Future Accelerators 1998–2000. For the academic year 1998–1999 he was a Guggenheim Fellow. He is a Fellow of the American Physical Society. In 1989 the Bruno Rossi Prize was awarded to the Kamiokande II team (and the Irvine-Michigan-Brookhaven team).

The Kamiokande II work and especially the observation from Supernova 1987a led to the award of the 2002 Nobel Prize in Physics to Masatoshi Koshiba. The Kamiokande II work (i.e. observation of an unexpected result in the ratio of electron neutrino to muon neutrino interactions from cosmic ray neutrinos produced in the earth's atmosphere) extended by the 1998 work by SuperKamiokande, along with the work of the science team in the Sudbury Neutrino Observatory, led to the 2015 award of the Nobel Prize in Physics to Takaaki Kajita and Arthur B. McDonald.

References

Selected publications
New Limit on the Strength of Mixing between νμ and νe, L. A. Ahrens, et al., (Brookhaven E734 Collaboration), Phys. Rev. D 31, 2732-36 (1985). 
Measurement of Neutrino-Proton and Antineutrino-Proton Elastic Scattering, L. A. Ahrens, et al., (Brookhaven E734 Collaboration), Phys. Rev. D 35, 785-809 (1987). 
Observation of a Neutrino Burst From the Supernova SN1987A, K. Hirata, et al., (Kamiokande II Collaboration), Phys. Rev. Lett. 58, 1490-93 (1987). 
Experimental Study of the Atmospheric Neutrino Flux, Kamiokande-II Collaboration (K.S. Hirata (Tokyo U., ICEPP) et al.). 1988. 17 pp. Published in Phys. Lett. B 205 (1988) 416 
Determination of electroweak parameters from the elastic scattering of muon neutrinos and antineutrinos on electrons, L.A. Ahrens, et al., (Brookhaven E734 Collaboration), Phys. Rev. D 41 3297-3316, (1990). 
Real-time, directional measurement of 8B solar neutrinos in the Kamiokande II detector, K.S. Hirata, et al., (Kamiokande II Collaboration), Phys. Rev. D 44, 2241-60 (1991). 
Observation of a small atmospheric muon-neutrino / electron-neutrino ratio in Kamiokande, Kamiokande-II Collaboration (K.S. Hirata (Tokyo U., ICRR) et al.). Jan 1992. 13 pp. Published in Phys. Lett. B 280 (1992) 146-152 
Atmospheric νμ/νe Ratio in the multi-GeV Range, Y. Fukuda, et al., (Kamiokande II Collaboration), Phys. Lett. B 335, 237-245 (1994). 
The Sudbury neutrino observatory, SNO Collaboration (J. Boger (Brookhaven) et al.). Oct 1999. 58 pp. Published in Nucl. Instrum. Methods A 449 (2000) 172-207 	
Measurement of the Rate of νe + d —> p + p + e– Interactions Produced by 8B Solar Neutrinos at the Sudbury Neutrino Observatory,  Q.R. Ahmad et al. (the SNO Collaboration), Phys. Rev. Lett., 87071301/1-6 (2001). 
Direct evidence for neutrino flavor transformation from neutral-current interactions in the Sudbury Neutrino Observatory, Q.R. Ahmad, et al. (The SNO Collaboration), Phys. Rev. Lett. 89 011301/1-6 (2002). 
Measurement of day and night neutrino energy spectra at SNO and constraints on neutrino mixing parameters, Q.R. Ahmad, et al. (The SNO Collaboration), Phys. Rev. Lett. 89 011302/1-5 (2002). 
Measurement of the total active 8B solar neutrino flux at the Sudbury Neutrino Observatory with enhanced neutral current sensitivity 
SNO Collaboration (S.N. Ahmed et al.). Sep 2003. 5 pp. Published in Phys. Rev. Lett. 92 (2004) 181301

External links
Oral History interview transcript for Eugene W. Beier on 27 April 2020, American Institute of Physics, Niels Bohr Library and Archives
Yoji Totsuka Memorial Symposium — Neutrino, Particle and Astroparticle Physics, June 2009

1940 births
Living people
People from Harvey, Illinois
21st-century American physicists
Stanford University alumni
Grainger College of Engineering alumni
University of Pennsylvania faculty
Fellows of the American Physical Society
Winners of the Panofsky Prize